Dade is a surname. Notable people with the surname include:

Alexander L. Dade (1863–1927), American military officer
Eric Dade (born 1970), American soccer player and coach
Everett C. Dade, mathematician
Francis L. Dade (died 1835), Major in the United States Army during the Seminole Wars
Harold Dade (1923–1962), American boxer
OMB Peezy (born as LeParis Dade in 1997), American rapper
Paul Dade (1951–2016), Major League Baseball player
Stephen Dade (1909–1975), English cinematographer